Darryn Smith (born 2 August 1975) is a South African baseball pitcher. Smith competed for South Africa at the 2000 Summer Olympics, where he appeared in one game as the pitcher, giving up three runs in three innings against South Korea. Smith also pitched for South Africa at the 2006 and 2009 World Baseball Classic.

He competed at the Africa/Europe 2020 Olympic Qualification tournament in Italy in September 2019.

References

1975 births
Living people
Baseball pitchers
Baseball players at the 2000 Summer Olympics
Olympic baseball players of South Africa
South African baseball players
Sportspeople from Durban
2006 World Baseball Classic players
2009 World Baseball Classic players